Jabučki Rit (Serbian Cyrillic: Јабучки Рит) is a suburban settlement of Belgrade, the capital of Serbia. It is located in the Belgrade's municipality of Palilula.

Location
Jabučki Rit is located in the northern, Banat section of the municipality, 23 kilometers northeast of downtown Belgrade. The settlement is built in the central part of the marsh of Pančevački Rit, on the Butuš canal. The settlement is outside of any major roads, being connected by the 10 kilometer long road (through Glogonjski Rit) to the Zrenjaninski put road which connects Belgrade with the town of Zrenjanin in Vojvodina. Small Romani settlement is located in Jabučki Rit.

Characteristics
The settlement is not classified as a separate one but, like the nearby Glogonjski Rit, as a sub-settlement of the 13 kilometers away Padinska Skela to the west, even though the three settlements make no continuous built-up area.

The settlement was named after the nearby village of Jabuka in Opovo municipality in Vojvodina and means Jabuka's marsh. As almost all of the settlements in the Pančevački Rit it developed after 1947 for housing workers employed in the melioration and later those who became workers of the PKB agricultural company.

Area is popular as a birdwatch post, especially for the great white egret which is believed to still be present in that area, but not being confirmed yet.

If Dunavski Venac detach from Palilula and becomes a separate municipality (process began in 2006) it is said that Jabučki Rit would also be detached from Padinska Skela into a separate settlement as indicated by the statute of the organization promoting the creation of new municipality.

External links 
 First official website, which is dedicated to all former, current and future residents of our beautiful settlement

Suburbs of Belgrade
Populated places in Serbian Banat
Palilula, Belgrade